The Executive Mansion of Liberia is the official residence and workplace of the country's president. Located across the street from the Capitol Building in the Capitol Hill district of Monrovia, the current building was constructed during the presidency of William Tubman, which lasted from 1944 to 1971. The construction started in 1961, and was completed in 1964.

The Executive Mansion was the scene of the murder of Tubman's successor, President William Tolbert (in office 1971–1980), during the 1980 coup d'état.

According to public hearings of the Truth and Reconciliation Commission (TRC), blood ritual and other sacrifices were performed at the Executive Mansion during the presidency of Samuel Doe, which lasted from 1980 to 1990. They were meant to render the president as well as the Executive Mansion impregnable. Hundreds of people, especially men, are also said to have been killed on the grounds of the Executive Mansion in the wake of the failed coup attempt by Thomas Quiwonkpa in 1985.

The Executive Mansion was destroyed by fire on July 26, 2006, during the 159th anniversary celebration of the adoption of the Liberian Declaration of Independence. President Ellen Johnson Sirleaf (in office 2006–2018) was at the time feting foreign guests and dignitaries in the gardens of the Executive Mansion. As of early 2021, a reopening was planned for early 2022. On 14 February 2022, the Executive Mansion was reopened.

Gallery

See also
Timeline of Monrovia

References

Buildings and structures in Monrovia
Buildings and structures completed in 1964
Presidential residences
Burned buildings and structures